Iris acutiloba  is a species in the genus Iris, it is also in the subgenus of Iris and section Oncocyclus. It is a rhizomatous perennial, from the mountains of the Caucasus and found in Turkey, Armenia, Azerbaijan, Turkmenistan, Dagestan in the North Caucasus, and Iran. It is a dwarf species, with narrow, falcate or curved leaves, it has one flower in spring or early summer, that comes in shades from cream, creamy white, whitish, pale brown, light grey, to pale violet. It is heavily veined or streaked and pointed, with 2 dark spots and brown, purple, dark purple, or black short beard. It is cultivated as an ornamental plant in temperate regions. There are two subspecies, Iris acutiloba subsp. lineolata and Iris acutiloba subsp. longitepala.

Description
It has a small, thick and compressed rhizomes, which have many branches, and gives the plant a creeping habit, across the surface of the ground, while being heated by the sun. The creeping habit creates clumps.

It has narrow, slender, curved, or falcate (sickle-shaped), leaves, that are glaucous, grey green, or medium green.

The stems hold 1, terminal, (top of stem) flower, blooming in spring, or early summer, between March (in Russia), April, or May. The leaves begin to grow in the late autumn and stop in the summer.

In his book 'Iris', Fritz Kohlein, wrote "the blossoms of this small plant render a sombre, bat-like effect."

Like other irises, it has 2 pairs of petals, 3 large sepals (outer petals), known as the 'falls' and 3 inner, smaller petals (or tepals), known as the 'standards'.
They are generally marked with 2, large dark red-brown, blackish, purple-violet, or dark purplish-brown spots, or deep purple signal patch. One spot is in the centre and the other is at the apex. In the middle of the falls, is a sparse, row of short hairs called the 'beard', which is brown, purple, dark purple, or black.

In the wild, it is more variable in colour and flower form.

After the iris has flowered, it produces a seed capsule, that contains large, white and yellow seeds.

Biochemistry
In 2015, a study was carried out on 8 species of iris found in Iran including Iris reticulata, Iris pseudocaucasica, Iris persica, Iris acutiloba and Iris meda. It found that the petals contain anthocyanins, (which are common floral pigments that form blue, purple and red colours).

As most irises are diploid, having two sets of chromosomes, this can be used to identify hybrids and classification of groupings.
It was counted in 1928 by Delaunay, in 1932 by Simonet, in 1969 by Zakharyeva & Makushenko, in 1975 by Gustafsson & Wendelbo and in 1980 by Awishai & Zohary. It is normally published as 2n=20.

Taxonomy
It is known in Russia as Ostrodolny Iris. Meaning 'sharp-lobed iris'.

The Latin specific epithet acutiloba is derived from two Latin words 'acutus' meaning acute or narrow and 'loba' meaning lobes or lobed. This is due to the narrow, pointed segments of the flower.

It was first published and described by Carl Anton von Meyer in Verz. Pfl. Casp. Meer. (sometimes known as Verz. Pfl, Cauc.) Vol.32 in Nov–Dec 1831.

It was also published in 'Gartenflora' Vol.13 page 323 in 1874, (with a colour illustration) and in The Gardeners' Chronicle 3rd Series Vol.94 on page 451 on 16 December 1932.

It has 2 known subspecies, Iris acutiloba subsp. lineolata and Iris acutiloba subsp. longitepala. Due to the classification of the subspecies, some authors have renamed the species as Iris acutiloba subsp. acutiloba Mathew & Wendelbo. Although many botanists in Russia and Turkey still classify Iris lineolata as a separate species.

It is listed in the 'Encyclopedia of Life, and in the Catalogue of Life as Iris acutiloba subsp. acutiloba.

Iris acutiloba is an accepted name by the RHS and was listed in the current RHS Plant Finder. It was also verified by United States Department of Agriculture and the Agricultural Research Service on 2 October 2014.

Distribution and habitat
It is endemic and native to temperate regions of Asia, and the Caucasus, including Transcaucasia.

Range
It is an, found in the countries of Turkey, (the former USSR states,) of Armenia, Azerbaijan, Turkmenistan, Dagestan (near the capital city of Makhachkala, and Barham,) and Iran. (or Persia,)

Habitat
It grows in the mountains, or dry hills, on rocky steppes and rocky slopes, or on sand.

Conservation
It is listed as a rare species, and is included in the Red Data Book of the Russian Federation as 'endangered'.

It is at risk due to the flowers being picked for bouquets. In the past 10–12 years, it has severely declined in population numbers. In 1969–1972, it was found over a large area (between 4–5 hectares), but this has now declined to a few isolated individuals being found.

In Dagestan, as part of the protected Dagestan Nature Reserve, there are two distinct sites; Kizlyar Bay and Sarykum, which have up to 279 species of rare plants.
On the 'Sarykum', sand dunes, it can be found with other rare plants such as Shishkin's groundsel (Senecio schischkinii),  Karakugen milkvetch, astragalus karakugensis and colchicum laetum.

Cultivation

As they grow in the mountains, they are much more cold hardy than some of the Oncocyclus section irises native to Israel-Palestine.

In Russia, it was tested for hardiness in various botanical gardens, it did not survive in Tbilisi, Baku, Frunze (or Bishkek), Nalchik and Alma-Ata. In the gardens of Moscow and St. Petersburg, it had unstable results.
 
As Iris acutiloba and the subspecies 'lineolata' are dwarf, they can be grown in a pot, with sharp drainage and careful watering, and kept (frost-free) in greenhouse or cold frame, or alpine house.

They should be planted in sandy, well drained soils in full sun. They need protection from spring and autumn rains. If planted in pots, they are left to dry from September and in the spring, given fertilizer during the growing season. Some irises have lived for 3–5 years under this method.

In 1904, it was rarely in cultivation in the UK, it is still fairly rare in cultivation in the west.

On 15 March 1900, a specimen was collected by Paul Sintenis near Baku, and then stored in the herbarium of Komarov Botanical Institute. Due to a mistake, it was labeled as Bailovo, but the actual correct name of the region near to the Danube is Brailovo.

Propagation
Irises can generally be propagated by division, or by seed growing, which can take up to 3–5 years or more to reach maturity.

Hybrids and cultivars

It has been used in various plant breeding programmes, including hybrid crosses; (with other regelia irises) 'Acutikor' and 'Tel Hashi', (with other Oncocyclus Section irises) 'Star Over Iran' and 'Zuvendicus'.

Cultivars which have Iris acutiloba as a grandparent include; 'Aril Sanctum', 'Darling Who Knows', 'Kazakhstan' and 'Rojen's Saga'.

Toxicity

Like many other irises, most parts of the plant are poisonous (rhizome and leaves), and can cause stomach pains and vomiting if mistakenly ingested. Handling the plant may cause skin irritation or an allergic reaction.

Culture
In 1993, it was used as a postage stamp in Azerbaijan, with a series of other flowers, including Iris reticulata, Tulipa persica, Puschkinia scilloides, Iris elegantissima and Tulipa florenskyii.

References

Sources
 Czerepanov, S. K. Vascular plants of Russia and adjacent states (the former USSR). 1995 (L USSR)
 Davis, P. H., ed. Flora of Turkey and the east Aegean islands. 1965–1988 (F Turk)
 Khassanov, F. O. & N. Rakhimova 2012. Taxonomic revision of the genus Iris L. (Iridaceae Juss.) for the flora of Central Asia (Stapfia) 97:177.
 Mathew, B. The Iris. 1981 (Iris) 43.
 Mathew, B. & M. Zarrei 2009. 654. Iris acutiloba subsp. longitepala Curtis's Bot. Mag. 26:253–259.
 Rechinger, K. H., ed. Flora iranica. 1963– (F Iran)

External links

acutiloba
Plants described in 1831
Garden plants
Flora of Central Asia
Flora of Kazakhstan
Flora of Armenia
Flora of Azerbaijan
Flora of Turkmenistan
Flora of Turkey
Flora of Iran
Flora of the North Caucasus